This list includes only those persons who served as mayors of Guangzhou since the mid-Warlord era.

Republic of China

Mayors

People's Republic of China

Mayors

See also 
 Timeline of Guangzhou
 Mayor of Beijing
 Mayor of Chongqing
 Mayor of Shanghai
 Mayor of Tianjin

1921 establishments in China